Walker's Hibernian Magazine, or Compendium of Entertaining Knowledge was a general-interest magazine published monthly in Dublin, Ireland, from February 1771 to July 1812. Until 1785 it was called The Hibernian Magazine or Compendium of Entertaining Knowledge (Containing, the greatest variety of the most curious and useful subjects in every branch of polite literature). Tom  Clyde called it "the pinnacle of eighteenth-century Irish literary magazines".

Publishers
The founding publisher was James Potts of Dame Street, who had published the Dublin Courier from 1766. From October 1772 until at least July 1773 Peter Seguin of St Stephen's Green published a rival version with differing format. Potts ceded in March 1774 to Thomas Walker, also of Dame Street, who added his surname to the magazine's title in May 1785. There was some production overlap  at this time with Exshaw's Magazine, since John Exshaw was selling out to Walker; this has caused later confusion. Thomas Walker retired from the publishing business in 1797, having ceded the Hibernian Magazine at the end of 1790 to his relative Joseph Walker, who died in 1805.

Content

The magazine had high production values, with regular illustrations and sometimes sheet music. It gave early encouragement to Thomas Moore.  According to Tom Clyde, "very little of the creative writing is worth reading"; it often featured Orientalism and rarely Romanticism. Much of the non-Irish material was reprinted from the European Magazine.  In 1883 C. J. Hamilton wrote:

What the Gentleman's Magazine was to England, Walker's Hibernian Magazine was to Ireland during the latter half of the eighteenth century. It has, perhaps, a more marked individuality of character and a stronger flavour of provincialism than the Gentleman's, and for these causes suits the curiosity-monger even better. It was at once a newspaper and a monthly miscellany of useful and entertaining literature. It not only gave parliamentary debates and the latest births, deaths, and marriages, but also tit-bits of London and Dublin gossip, the newest outrages, the most thrilling sentimental tales à la Werther, along with scraps of poetry and tête-à-tête portraits of the leading fashionable belles and beaux of the day.

Up to about 1795, the magazine showed sympathy for women's rights and Catholic emancipation. Afterwards it became more reactionary in opposition to the United Irishmen. With the onset of the Napoleonic Wars, news and patriotic coverage crowded out cultural and antiquarian content.

It is a primary source for Irish history of the period; its unofficial report of the trial of Robert Emmet in September 1803 differs from the official trial transcript and includes the first version of his celebrated speech from the dock. An index to marriages announced in its pages was compiled by Henry Farrar in the 1890s.

References

Footnotes

Sources

Citations

External links

Digitised volumes:
 HathiTrust: 
 1771-3-4-5, 1781-2-3-4-5 (1785 miscatalogued as 1786) 
 1772, 1786–1811 (excluding 1791, 1795, June 1798–Dec 1799)
 Internet Archive: 1776, 1777, 1780

1770s establishments in Ireland
1810s disestablishments in Ireland
Defunct magazines published in Ireland
Magazines published in Ireland
Magazines established in the 1770s
Magazines disestablished in 1812
Mass media in Dublin (city)
Literary magazines published in Ireland
Defunct literary magazines published in Europe